Allan Gutiérrez Castro (born 12 August 1993) is a Honduran swimmer. He was born in San Pedro Sula. At the 2012 Summer Olympics in London, he competed in the Men's 400 metre freestyle, finishing in 28th place in the heats.

References

1993 births
Living people
Honduran male freestyle swimmers
Olympic swimmers of Honduras
Swimmers at the 2012 Summer Olympics
Swimmers at the 2016 Summer Olympics
Swimmers at the 2015 Pan American Games
Swimmers at the 2010 Summer Youth Olympics
Swimmers at the 2011 Pan American Games
Pan American Games competitors for Honduras
21st-century Honduran people